"It's Not You" is the second single released by the hard rock band, Halestorm. It is taken from their self-titled debut album.

Charts

References

Halestorm songs
2009 songs
Songs written by Howard Benson
Songs written by Lzzy Hale